Sophronica improba is a species of beetle in the family Cerambycidae. It was described by Francis Polkinghorne Pascoe.

References

Sophronica
Beetles described in 1858